The Glacier Institute (established in 1983) is a 501(c)(3) non-profit corporation located in Columbia Falls, Montana. According to the U.S. National Park Service, the Glacier Institute provides field-based learning experiences to the public, and serves as an official partner to the Glacier National Park, specializing in field seminars. The Glacier Institute also conducts fund-raising activities for its youth programs, which take place at its Big Creek Outdoor Education Center. The institute has been featured in a book Study Science at the Glacier Institute written by Bruce Larkin. Glacier Institute has two campuses: its "Glacier Park Field Camp," located inside the West Glacier entrance of Glacier National Park, and its "Big Creek Outdoor Education Center," located in the Flathead National Forest.

Along with partnering with Flathead National Forest and Glacier National Park, the Glacier Institute is also a long-time partner with the Montana Fish, Wildlife and Parks Department, and Flathead Valley Community College.

References

External links
 Glacier Institute

Organizations established in 1983
Charities based in Montana
Glacier National Park (U.S.)
Education in Montana
Environmental education in the United States
1983 establishments in Montana
Outdoor education organizations